In enzymology, a formyltetrahydrofolate dehydrogenase is an enzyme that catalyzes the chemical reaction

10-formyltetrahydrofolate + NADP+ + H2O  tetrahydrofolate + CO2 + NADPH + H+

The 3 substrates of this enzyme are 10-formyltetrahydrofolate, NADP+, and H2O, whereas its 4 products are tetrahydrofolate, CO2, NADPH, and H+.

This enzyme belongs to the family of oxidoreductases, to be specific those acting on the CH-NH group of donors with NAD+ or NADP+ as acceptor.  The systematic name of this enzyme class is 10-formyltetrahydrofolate:NADP+ oxidoreductase. Other names in common use include 10-formyl tetrahydrofolate:NADP oxidoreductase, 10-formyl-H2PtGlu:NADP oxidoreductase, 10-formyl-H4folate dehydrogenase, N10-formyltetrahydrofolate dehydrogenase, and 10-formyltetrahydrofolate dehydrogenase.  This enzyme participates in one carbon pool by folate.

Structural studies

References

 

EC 1.5.1
NADPH-dependent enzymes
Enzymes of known structure